The 2019–20 TT Pro League season is the 21st season of the TT Pro League, the Trinidad and Tobago professional league for association football clubs, since its establishment in 1999. A total of eleven teams are contesting the league, with W Connection the defending champions from the 2018 season.

League play officially started on 13 December 2019 and was originally to end in April 2020. However, due to the COVID-19 pandemic in Trinidad and Tobago, the league was cut short and Defence Force were crowned champions virtue of being top of the league by the time of cancellation. It was their first title since the 2012–13 season.

Changes from the 2018 season

Cunupia FC were admitted into the league, bringing the total number of teams to eleven.
St. Ann's Rangers relocated to La Horquetta, Arima and rebranded to La Horquetta Rangers
North East Stars relocated to Port of Spain and rebranded to AC Port of Spain

Teams

Team summaries

Note: Flags indicate national team as has been defined under FIFA eligibility rules. Players may hold more than one non-FIFA nationality.

League table

Results

Top scorers

References

External links
Official Website

TT Pro League seasons
Trinidad and Tobago
2019 in Trinidad and Tobago